The Tuancheng Fortress or Tuan Cheng Fortress (Chinese: t , s , p Tuánchéng Yǎnwǔtīng, lit. "Round Wall Fortress") is a historic 18th-century fortress located near the Fragrant Hills in the Haidian District of Beijing, China.  Today, the fortress is a national museum and is also known as the Tuancheng Exhibition Hall.

The fortress was built in the 14th year of the Qianlong Emperor's reign (AD 1749). Tuancheng was a castellated military training compound used by the Qing to train, inspect, and honor their troops.

The site is especially well preserved. Today, the fortress frequently holds large-scale martial arts events and attracts fans from all around China.

References

External links
The Tuang Cheng Fortress at Beijing government website 

Forts in China
Major National Historical and Cultural Sites in Beijing
Tourist attractions in Beijing
Museums in Beijing
Military and war museums in China
18th-century establishments in China